Beit Shemesh is a city located approximately  west of Jerusalem in Israel's Jerusalem District, with a population of  in .

History

Tel Beit Shemesh

The small archaeological tell northeast of the modern city was identified in the late 1830s as Biblical Beth Shemesh – it was known as Ain Shams – by Edward Robinson. The tel was excavated in numerous phases during the 20th century.

Early development town years
The area that compromised Beit Shemesh today was under Ottoman rule and later British Mandate of Palestine. The Ramat Beit Shemesh neighborhood area was the site belonging to the Arab village Bayt Nattif, which was built on remnants of an ancient Judean town, with various remnants of Jewish settlement from the time, such as a mosaic floor, wineries and other remains, especially from the period of the Hasmonean kings and earlier. This area is currently under dispute about preservation, having been the subject of a grassroots campaign. Under the proposed United Nations Partition Plan for Palestine, the town was slated to be part of an internationalized Jerusalem.

On 6 December 1950, the Hartuv displaced persons camp "Ma'abarat Har-Tuv" was established on the site of the current-day Moshav Naham. The first inhabitants were Jewish Bulgarian immigrants. They were joined by more Jewish immigrants from Bulgaria, Iran, Iraq, Romania, Morocco and Kurdistan. 

In 1952 the first permanent houses were built in Beit Shemesh.  In its early years, Beit Shemesh came to typify the "Development Town" with a largely Maghrebi immigrant population. In 1977, following a writeup in Haaretz newspaper, Beit Shemesh was perceived as the main outpost for Menachem Begin's Likud party. He promised to rehabilitate neighborhoods and when Likud came to power that year, investment in the city increased.

21st century
The Israel Police maintains a bomb disposal specialist unit and training center in Beit Shemesh.

The Nahala UMenucha neighborhood and Ramat Beit Shemesh were built in the 1990s, doubling the size of the city. In 2017, the Israeli government approved a master plan to build 17,000 new housing units along with 130 acres zoned as new commercial space for businesses and hotels. It is expected that the city could be home to as many as 250,000 residents by 2025 and 350,000 by 2035. A new commercial center in the Ramat Beit Shemesh neighborhood is planned to be the city's largest. In 2020, the construction of a hospital in Beit Shemesh, which will be run as a branch of Hadassah Medical Center, was approved.

Demographics

When the city was built in the 1950s, it was initially settled by new immigrants from Iran, Iraq, Romania, Bulgaria, Morocco and Iraqi Kurdistan. In the 1990s, the city saw a large influx of new immigrants from the former Soviet Union, Ethiopia and English-speaking countries, turning it into a major center for Anglo immigrants. Considerable numbers have come from North America, the United Kingdom, South Africa and Australia. This population tends to be Orthodox, educated and from middle income groups. At the same time, Orthodox Jews from within Israel also began moving to the city, seeking roomier, low-cost housing.

According to a city councillor, there were no Haredim in Beit Shemesh before the 1990s. Since then, Beit Shemesh has become increasingly religious, with a large Haredi sector. Many synagogues and yeshivas have been built in the city. Religious communities represented in Beit Shemesh include Chabad Ger, Belz, American Yeshivish, French sefardim, South African Modern Orthodox, Israeli Dati Leumi and more recently a Spanish speaking community.  In 2011 Haredim made up 40% of the population. According to statistics published by the municipality, 63% of the city's schoolchildren in 2010 were Haredim. 75% of the children entering the first grade in the 2012/2013 academic year will be registered in official Haredi institutions.

Ramat Beit Shemesh

Ramat Beit Shemesh is an expansion that lies directly adjacent to, and to the south of, the original part of Beit Shemesh, colloquially referred to as "Old Beit Shemesh". It is located on a hill overlooking the old town. Ramat Beit Shemesh has a large, diverse Orthodox population. Originally, it consisted of two areas: Ramat Beit Shemesh Alef and Ramat Beit Shemesh Bet. In Ramat Beit Shemesh Bet, families belonging to Eda Haredit constitute the majority. In 2002, following tensions between the Haredi and non-religious population, plans were drawn up to build another secular neighborhood, HaShachar. In 2007, Ramat Shilo, considered a subdistrict of Ramat Beit Shemesh, with both Dati Leumi and Haredi residents was built. In 2009, it was announced that a new neighborhood, Ramat Beit Shemesh Gimmel, would be built as a largely Haredi neighborhood on a large block of state-owned land bordering southern Beit Shemesh. In 2016 the Israeli Land Authority published tenders for 3,268 new apartments, to be built in the newly proposed areas of Ramat Beit Shemesh Dalet and Hey. According to plans, ultimately there are to be 8,300 new apartments in RBS Dalet alone.

Ramat Beit Shemesh Alef
Ramat Beit Shemesh Aleph is a neighborhood of Beit Shemesh comprising about 25,000 people. The neighborhood has numerous parks and public areas being well maintained. The newest park is Yarmut Park, the biggest in Beit Shemesh. Shopping is plentiful as well, with 4 supermarkets and a shopping area with over 130 shops. The area has a few different sections each with its own unique touch and strong points. There is the Dolev section, the Revivim section, and the Mishkenos Yaakov section.

The Dolev section contains a heterogeneous mix of native Israelis and immigrants. Religiosity varies as well from Hareidi until Masorti or Dati Leumi, with each group having its own synagogues and schools, in general. Masos/Masot Mordechai is a place where all types come together to pray at all times of the day. Points of interest in the Dolev section are the Matnas, a community center that services all types of Jews of the RBS A community, and Park Center, a mini-mall of various stores and restaurants. Streets include Dolev, Shimshon, Timnah, Yarkon, and Yarden.

The Revivim section is lower down than Dolev. This area is populated mostly by Haredim, both Israeli and Chutznikim, with religious levels ranging from American Frum all the way to a few Yerushalmis. With the majority being Chutznik, much of the neighborhood is connected to an American Minyan such as the Gra, Pnei Shmuel, or others. There is a big emphasis on living a Torah lifestyle which pervades the area. Streets include Revivim, Ramot, Gilo, Noam, and Achziv. (A way to remember these streets is their geographic location, from west to east, and from lower to higher on the hill. After Noam, come the GRA streets (Gilo, Ramot, Achziv), which culminate near the GRA shul.)

The Mishkenos Yaakov section is located next to the Merkaz (central shopping area). Here the population is almost exclusively Haredim, both Israelis and Chutznikim, although the Chuznikim tend to lean towards their Israeli counterparts regarding religious/cultural issues. There is an official Rav (Mara D'Asra), Rav Mordechai Goldstein (son of Rav Tuvia ztl), who is looked up to as the respected opinion regarding religious questions and community projects. Points of interest in the Mishkenos Yaakov area include Lev Eliyahu, the synagogue with the most Minyanim in all of RBSA and most likely the most hasmada (diligence in Torah study), and the Merkaz, the shopping center more than 130 stores of all types. Streets include Sorek (lower half), Kishon, Uriah, Micha, and Shacham.

A further expansion to Ramat Beit Shemesh is the leafy suburbs of Mishkafayim located at the eastern edge of Aleph overlooking the Zanoah quarry. The area, still under development, has started to be populated. The make up is entirely by Orthodox Jews of all strands including Chasidish, Hareidi and Dati Leumi. 
The area currently has 6 minyanim.

Organizations based in Ramat Beit Shemesh Aleph include:

Lema'an Achai – A social services charity that has successfully assisted hundreds of families through and out of financial and other crisis with an emphasis on achieving financial independence.
Hatzola Beit Shemesh – An independent organization combining first response and follow-up care of emergency medical situations.
Kupa Shel Tzedaka – A charity organization helping needy families to rehabilitate them to self-sufficiency. (Mishkenos Yaakov has a separate organization for their needy families.)
Ezrat Achim – A medical aid organization such as trips to the hospital, x-rays, and loan of medical equipment.
Mishkan Adei Ad – An organization which assists needy families with the vast expenses of making weddings.
Hakeshiva – An organization which focuses on the prevention of, and the aiding of teens-at-risk.

Ramat Beit Shemesh Bet
Ramat Beit Shemesh Bet is primarily populated by Charedi Jews, of which most are Hasidic Jews of various dynasties.

Ramat Beit Shemesh Gimmel
Ramat Beit Shemesh Gimmel is located just south of Ramat Beit Shemesh Aleph. Gimmel consists of two parts, Gimmel 1 and Gimmel 2. Gimmel 1 is already populated with about 2,000 apartments, Gimmel 2 is currently under construction. With its lowers density building and larger apartments as well as the many open spaces and parks Gimmel 1 is seen as more appealing to the Anglo-Saxon public. Gimmel 1 is officially named "Kiryat Avi Ezri", while Gimmel 2 is named "Kiryat Ovadia".

Gimmel 1 developed into a thriving neighborhood in a very short time and as of 2018 has many synagogues, stores, clinics and schools.

Ramat Beit Shemesh Daled
As of 2020, this neighbourhood is still under construction. The residents - most of whom are projected to be Haredi - are expected to move in within a year.

A total of 8,000 homes and apartments will be built in three stages; Daled 1, Daled 2 and Daled 3. The neighborhoods of Daled 1 and Daled 2 will each comprise 3,000 apartments, and Daled 4 will have 2,000 apartments.

Ramat Beit Shemesh Hey / Neve Shamir
The neighborhood, under construction, was originally earmarked for the non-Haredi public and it was designed like non-Haredi neighborhood. However, being that some of the apartments were marketed as part of mechir lamishtacain and the tenders were won by many Haredi and Religious Zionist families, this area also seems to be turning into a religious neighborhood. The rest is being sold in the private market, with many Haredim already have purchased houses. 
According to the mayor, Aliza Bloch, "We are witnessing a group of purchasers of residents of Beit Shemesh being divided among the general public, another group outside the city, such as: Gush Etzion, Mevaseret Zion and Jerusalem, and a group of people from abroad, mainly from the US, a community-oriented population such as the Sheinfeld neighborhood. Just a year ago, I toured the US and met with many groups whose fruits are for the encounters that I see there today. In addition, we try to interest the teachers' union, such as the Ashmoreth group, where teachers and education people, the Neve Shamir neighborhood is of interest to them." In May 2020, Dozens of national and secular religious couples (hiloni and dathi leomi) took part in a tour of the Neve Shamir neighborhood with Mayor Aliza Bloch and her deputy. Those in attendance answered current questions and information from the field. In light of the success of the reunion, more tours were held.

Ramat Shilo
Ramat Shilo was built in 2007 with 340 housing units geared toward Modern Orthodox Jews. Since then, the neighborhood has experienced rapid growth and development. The residents of Ramat Shilo are Orthodox Jews, both Dati Leumi and Haredi. The neighborhood has a large community of English-speaking olim. Its residents are both Ashkenazim and Sephardim.

Ramat Shilo has a number of synagogues, yeshivas and kollels. The largest institution is Yeshivat Lev Hatorah, a Religious Zionist yeshiva founded by Rabbi Boaz Mori. The local synagogues include Beis Dovid/Pilzno Beis HaMedrash, a Hasidic synagogue representing the Pilzno Hasidic dynasty under the leadership of Rabbi Yehoshua Gerzi, Mishkan Shilo, an Ashkenazi synagogue under the leadership of Rabbi Dovid Bagno, Mishkan Moshe Va'Eliyahu, a Sephardi synagogue under the leadership of Rabbi Shai Naftali, and Ohev Yisroel, a Hasidic synagogue under the leadership of Rabbi Binyomin Flintenstein of the Kapishnitzer Hassidic dynasty.

Notable residents of Ramat Shilo include:
 Rabbi Avraham Jacobovitz, founder of Machon L'Torah and Jewish Awareness America (JAAM)
 Rabbi Dr. Howard Apfel, Cardiologist at Columbia University Medical Center.
 Rabbi Yehoshua Fass, founder and executive director of Nefesh B'Nefesh
Among the communal organizations is Chasdei Shilo which provides assistance for families with financial difficulties as well as serves as a communal resource network.

Urban kibbutz Tamuz
Beit Shemesh also has an urban kibbutz affiliated with the Kibbutz Movement, Tamuz, founded in 1987.

Local government
Although Bet Shemesh has a heavy Haredi majority, the current mayor of Beit Shemesh is Dr. Aliza Bloch. She assumed office in November 2018 after extremely close elections which in the end got her the win by the votes of the IDF soldiers from Bet Shemesh. She is also the first female mayor of Beit Shemesh.

The previous mayor of Beit Shemesh was Moshe Abutbul. He is currently a Knesset member as a member of Shas. The deputy-mayor, Shmuel Greenberg, is a member of United Torah Judaism (UTJ). Haaretz quotes Abutbul as saying: "Beit Shemesh is not a Haredi city and will not be one." In the 2009 elections, Shas and UTJ won nine seats in the 21-seat municipal council, one seat went to a new Haredi party called Tov.

Formerly a Likud stronghold, in the 2006 Knesset elections United Torah Judaism became the city's strongest party, with 22.2 percent of the votes and Shas getting 19.9 percent. In 2009 Likud regained its primacy, obtaining 22.2 percent of the votes, and Shas also gained, garnering 20.9 percent, with United Torah Judaism a close third at 20.6 percent. Eda Haredit boycott the elections.

During the municipal elections held on 22 October 2013, acting on several anonymous tips, police raided several private residences and recovered 200 ID cards and disguising materials such as hats, glasses and wigs which law enforcement suspected were used or going to be used for fraudulent voting. Additionally, eight people were arrested on suspicion for engaging and coordinating fraudulent voting activities.

On 10 December 2013, a three-judge panel of the Jerusalem District Court nullified the results of the October municipal elections due to voter fraud and ordered a new election.

Following an unprecedented 76% voter turnout rate, incumbent mayor Moshe Abutbul beat contender Eli Cohen with a 51% majority vote during the reelection which took place on 11 March 2014.

Heads of Local Council: 

 Shmuel Aviezer (1953–1955)
 Menahem Noyman (1955–1965)
 Oved Seri Levy (1965–1967)
  (1967–1978)
 Yehuda Ben-Zeev (1978–1989)

Mayors: 

 Shalom Fadida (1989–1993)
 Daniel Vaknin (1993–2008)
 Moshe Abutbul (2008–2018)
 Aliza Bloch (2018-present)

Education
In 2001, there were 56 schools and 14,148 students in the city: 41 elementary schools with 10,716 elementary school students, and 20 high schools with 3,432 high school students. 40.3% of 12th grade students were entitled to a matriculation certificate.

Economy
Beit Shemesh has two industrial zones containing mainly small industry, particularly in the Northern industrial zone which is typified by carpentry and metalwork workshops, garages and wholesale and retail outlets. The Western industrial zone contains several larger companies including Beit Shemesh Engines Ltd. (BSEL) which manufactures and repairs jet engines and jet engine components, Barzellan and others. Nearby in the Noham industrial zone are situated various other factories and offices. Since the high tech boom of 1996–2001 Beit Shemesh has been host to several hi-tech startups including Omek Interactive.

Transportation

Bus transportation within Beit Shemesh and most inter-city routes is operated by Tnufah and Kavim as of 2021 replacing the former Superbus, which began service on 5 January 2009. The Egged Bus Cooperative, which previously operated all bus service in and to Beit Shemesh, still operates to some distant cities but no longer operates from Beit Shemesh to Jerusalem. Nateev express operates busses to Tsfat and Netivot.

 Tnufa operates the inter-city bus routes as of 2021 The travel time between Beit Shemesh and Jerusalem by bus is between 40 min and 1 hour.  Transportation to Tel aviv is between an hour and an hour and fifteen minutes.

The new express lines to Jerusalem are direct with new addition such as bus line 600 and the night lines.

Kavim operates over 40 bus routes with over 200 eco friendly electric busses serving all areas of the city as of 2021.

Beit Shemesh Railway Station provides hourly service on the Israel Railways Herzliya–Lod–Jerusalem line. The station is located in the north industrial zone of Beit Shemesh at the Big Fashion Mall and shopping center across from Shaarei Hair Mall. It was renovated in 2003 after being in operation for close to 100 years.

The bullet train from the Central Bus Station in Jerusalem takes 20 min to Ben Gurion International Airport and 30 min to Tel Aviv departing every 30 min.

It was renovated and reopened on 13 September 2003, having existed for over a century at the same location. The station has three platforms.

Sports
Beit Shemesh is home to numerous sports clubs all under the main sport associations (Beitar, Hapoel, and Maccabi). The city has soccer teams including juniors, seniors and over-35s teams and boasted a franchise in the Israel Baseball League. The Beit Shemesh Blue Sox represented Beit Shemesh in the league's only season, though they played their games at Gezer Field in Kibbutz Gezer due to a lack of proper facilities in Beit Shemesh. There is also a very active Little League in Beit Shemesh and Ramat Beit Shemesh, with over 300 members.
In the field of judo, Elitzur Beit Shemesh has won many prizes. Israel Kung Fu and world Nunchaku champion (2001) Eli Ivgi was born in and lives in Beit Shemesh.
Construction of a regulation-sized baseball field in Bet Shemesh is planned. The ground-breaking ceremony taking place on 6 January 2017.

Arab-Israeli conflict

Beit Shemesh was not involved in any Arab conflict since 1997.  On 13 March 1997, seven 13 and 14-year-old girls from Beit Shemesh's AMIT Fuerst School were killed at the "Island of Peace" site in Naharayim in Northern Israel by a Jordanian soldier while on a school class trip. They were visiting the joint Israeli and Jordanian tourist resort under Jordanian rule. King Hussein of Jordan went to Beit Shemesh a few days after the massacre to extend his condolences and ask forgiveness in the name of his country, a step which was seen as both courageous and touching.

Gender issues and inter-city conflict
Though there are differing cultural and religious backgrounds it is common to find holiday celebrations, concerts and public events that attract residents of all the various Jewish religious communities who celebrate together harmoniously such as the annual Lag baomer Parade, Yom Haatzmaut independence day fireworks and municipality sponsored performances at public parks and sports arenas, Passover and Succot events in the parks and street processions for Hachnasat Sefer Torah dedications.

All public bus service is operated with mixed gender seating.  Tnufah Bus compay which started service in 2022 and Kavim Express are currently the transportation carriers in Beit Shemesh.  Previously Superbus and Egged also provided bus service.  By law there is no discrimination in seating between men and women on all public transportation.

Communal tensions 
In 2022 Beit Shemesh is a thriving city with a mainly Orthodox and modern Orthodox population.  The growing pains of communal tentions of two decades ago have faded since the efforts of the last two mayors: Moshe Abutbul who now is a Knesset member and Aliza Bloch, the current mayor. Beit Shemesh is considered a religious, family oriented city where children can walk safely and freely both day and night in all parts of the city.

In 2004 the Israel Association of Ethiopian Jews claimed that Ethiopian Jews working for the municipality were being paid below-minimum wages. In 2011, the Association criticized the referral of Ethiopian Jews to three private pre-schools run by the mayor's wife.

According to The Jerusalem Post, women who belong to a Haredi burqa sect in Beit Shemesh were ostracized by the Haredi community. The leader of the movement, dubbed the "Taliban mother" by the Israeli press, was convicted by the Jerusalem District Court in 2009 on three counts of abuse of a minor and 25 counts of assault in aggravated circumstances, and sentenced to four years in prison. Her husband was also convicted of 10 counts of assault and three counts of abuse of a minor or helpless person, and was sentenced to six months in jail.

In 2011, conflicts erupted in Beit Shemesh between extremist ultra-Orthodox men, possibly members of a group known as the Sikrikim, and other residents of the town due to gender separation at local health clinics, and so called ‘mehadrin buses’ where men sit in the front and women in the back.

When the municipality removed a sign asking women to stay away from a synagogue, hundreds of Haredi men staged riots in which they attacked police officers and reporters. Several placards urging segregation between men and women were put back after being removed by the police.

After the opening of Orot Banot national-religious girls' school in the heart of the Ultra-Orthodox neighborhood in September 2011, groups of Haredi extremists gathered in front of the school, calling the girls names and spitting at them when they headed to and from school. Stones hurled at a boys' school belonging to the same educational network injured a boy in the leg. Two men were arrested on suspicion of throwing eggs and tomatoes at students. In a demonstration outside the school a female journalist was assaulted by young Haredi men who cursed and spat at her, and a clash with parents of girls studying at the school was broken up by the police force.

In December 2011, a public outcry was raised when a television news channel interviewed 8-year-old Na'ama Margolese, who was cursed and spat at on her way to school by Haredi extremists.
The Jewish Daily Forward reported that the issue is really a property dispute over ownership of the school building. Some Haredi women distributed flowers to the girls of Orot Banot school, telling them "sister to sister" that they were beautiful. On 27 December 2011, a protest against extremism near the Orot Banot school drew 10,000 people. After the incidents in Beit Shemesh were reported in foreign press, the US State Department updated its Jerusalem travel advisory advising visitors to "dress appropriately" when visiting ultra-Orthodox Jewish neighborhoods, or to avoid them entirely.
 
Na'ama's mother Hadassah Margolese who has repeatedly spoken out on behalf of national religious Beit Shemesh residents against Haredi tendencies, including about an occurrence in which little girls' faces were blurred out on Purim advertisements distributed in her neighborhood, and a humiliating experience at the ritual bath reportedly left Beit Shemesh with her family in late July 2013 after being attacked by members of her own national religious community who accused her of exposing the community to public shame.

in February 2015 Judge David Gideoni accepted a claim filed by four women who protested an illegal "modesty sign" posted in Ramat Beit Shemesh Bet. The judge ordered Mayor Moshe Abutbul and the Beit Shemesh Municipality to pay each of the women complainants NIS 15,000. The city then saw further signs of "religious radicalization" when the word "woman" was repeatedly erased from a sign at a women's health center.

Archaeology

Middle Bronze
In 1971, excavations at Givat Sharett conducted by Israeli archaeologist Claire Epstein revealed a residential settlement of the Middle Bronze Age, including a temple.

Late Brone and Iron Age
The most ancient iron workshop in the world was discovered in Beit Shemesh in 2003. The only remnants of a fortified city with an advanced water system, from the time of the early Kingdom of Judah was found here. The bones of animals found in the 12th–11th centuries BCE layer indicate a diet typical of the Israelites who inhabited the hill country in this period. These together with the pottery finds indicate the cultural influences on the inhabitants of this border town. However, it is not possible to determine their specific ethnic identity, which could be Canaanite, Philistine or Israelite.

In August 2012, archaeologists from Tel Aviv University announced the discovery of a circular stone seal, approximately 15 millimetres in diameter. The seal was found on the floor of a house at Beit Shemesh and is dated to the 12th century BCE. According to Haaretz, "excavation directors Prof. Shlomo Bunimovitz and Dr. Zvi Lederman of Tel Aviv University say they do not suggest that the human figure on the seal is the biblical Samson. Rather, the geographical proximity to the area where Samson lived, and the time period of the seal, show that a story was being told at the time of a hero who fought a lion, and that the story eventually found its way into the biblical text and onto the seal."

Animal bones found nearby may also be a clue to boundary disputes between different cultures. Pig bones have been found a few kilometres from Beit Shemesh, but only a few have been found actually at Beit Shemesh and at some point during the 11th century BCE it appears that the local population stopped eating pig. Haaretz reports that "According to Bunimovitz, when the pork-eating Philistines arrived in the country from the Aegean, the local people stopped eating pork to differentiate themselves from the newcomers."

Later History
Calcite alabaster was quarried in ancient times in the cave known today as the Twins Cave near Beit Shemesh. Herod used this alabaster for baths in his palaces during the 1st century BCE.

In 2014, archaeologists Irene Zilberbod and Tehila Libman announced the nearby discovery of a large compound from the Byzantine period that was most probably a monastery. It comprised a residential area and an industrial area with wine and olive presses. The remains of buildings with two or three stories and impressive mosaic floors were discovered. The compound ceased to function in the early Muslim period and was subsequently occupied by other residents.
The excavations were continuing with additional finds through late 2017.

Twin towns – sister cities

Beit Shemesh is twinned with:
 Cocoa, Florida, United States
 Hangzhou, China
 Nordhausen, Germany
 Nottingham, England, United Kingdom
 Ramapo, New York, United States
 Split, Croatia
 Jersey City, New Jersey, United States

In the Partnership 2gether program of the Jewish Agency for Israel, Beit Shemesh and the Mateh Yehuda Regional Council are linked to South Africa and Washington, D.C.

After The Washington Post'' reported in October 2011 that Montgomery County, Maryland was considering a partnership with Beit Shemesh, a local coalition, Human Rights Matter!, objected. The campaign was supported by the Mossawa Center, an organization that defines its goal as the promotion of equality for the Arab minority in Israel but which has been criticized for its rejection of Israel as a Jewish state and its foreign funding from the European Commission, George Soros's Open Society Institute and the New Israel Fund, among others, as well as Nobel Peace Prize laureate Mairead Maguire.

Notable people

 Nissim Black (born 1986), American-Israeli rapper and producer
 Nili Block (born 1995), world champion kickboxer and Muay Thai fighter
 Adam Edelman (born 1991), American-born four-time Israeli national champion in the skeleton event, and Israeli Olympian
 Jamie Geller (born 1978), American-born food writer, celebrity chef, television producer and businesswoman
 Ari Goldwag (born 1979), singer, songwriter, composer, and music producer
 Hezekiah (born 739 BCE), King of Judah
 Avraham Jacobovitz, founder of Machon L'Torah and Jewish Awareness America (JAAM)
 Yosef Karduner (born 1969), singer, songwriter, and composer.
 Shmuel Kozokin (born 1987), footballer
 Tahounia Rubel (born 1988), fashion model and television personality
 Natan Slifkin (born 1975), "Zoo Rabbi", director of the Biblical Museum of Natural History and author on the topics of zoology and science
 Eli Stefansky (born 1972) American born real-estate developer, founder & maggid shiur Mercaz Daf Yomi in RBSa

References

External links

Beit Shemesh Municipality
Places To Visit in Beit Shemesh
 Lilia Kirshenbaum, Tsagai Asamain and Avi Perets, Bet Shemesh- Machsia, Khirbet el-Suyyagh: Relocation of an olive oil press, Israel Antiquities Authority Site - Conservation Department

 
Cities in Israel
Hebrew Bible cities
Tells (archaeology)
Bronze Age sites in Israel
Iron Age sites in Israel
Canaanite cities
Levitical cities
Ancient Jewish settlements of Judaea
Biblical geography
Orthodox Jewish communities
Development towns
Cities in Jerusalem District